This is the filmography of prominent Telugu cinema actor Akkineni Nageswara Rao.

All films are in Telugu, unless otherwise noted.

References

External links
 

Indian filmographies
Male actor filmographies